The second season of Supernatural, an American dark fantasy  television series created by Eric Kripke, premiered on September 28, 2006, and concluded on May 17, 2007, airing 22 episodes. The season focuses on protagonists Sam (Jared Padalecki) and Dean Winchester (Jensen Ackles) as they track down Azazel, the demon responsible for the deaths of their mother Mary and father John. They attempt to discover the demon's plan for Sam and other psychic children—young adults who were visited by Azazel as infants and given abilities, and whose mothers often then died in a fire. During their travels, they use their father's journal to help them carry on the family business—saving people and hunting supernatural creatures.

The season aired on Thursdays at 9:00 pm ET in the United States, and was the first season to air on The CW television network, a joint venture of The WB and UPN. The previous season was broadcast on The WB. It averaged only about 3.14 million American viewers, and was in danger of not being renewed. The show gained mostly positive reviews, with the cast and crew garnering many award nominations and praise being given towards the brotherly chemistry between the two leads, however the formulaic structure of the episodes was criticized.

The season was internationally syndicated, airing in the United Kingdom on ITV, in Canada on Citytv and SPACE, and in Australia on Network Ten. It was released on DVD as a six-disc box set September 11, 2007, by Warner Home Video in Region 1. Although the season was split into two separate releases in Region 2, the complete set was released on October 29, 2007, and in Region 4 on October 3, 2007. The episodes are also available through digital retailers such as Apple's iTunes Store, Microsoft's Xbox Live Marketplace, and Amazon.com's on-demand TV service.

Cast

Starring
 Jared Padalecki as Sam Winchester
 Jensen Ackles as Dean Winchester

Special guest star
 Linda Blair as Diana Ballard

Guest stars

Episodes

In this table, the number in the first column refers to the episode's number within the entire series, whereas the number in the second column indicates the episode's number within this particular season. "U.S. viewers in millions" refers to how many Americans watched the episode live or on the day of broadcast.

Production

Casting
The writers used the second season to expand upon the concept of hunters, resulting in the introduction of many recurring characters through the hunter-frequented saloon—Harvelle's Roadhouse. Samantha Ferris portrayed Ellen Harvelle, proprietor of the Roadhouse and an old friend of John Winchester, while Alona Tal played Ellen's daughter Jo. This pair complemented the father-son relationship of the Winchesters in the first year. Ferris believes she was exactly what the producers were looking for: a "tough, strong, yet a little maternal actor". Tal's character, on the other hand, was an intended love interest for Dean, and was eventually phased out because she came off as more of a sister figure. Chad Lindberg portrayed the genius Ash, who uses his vast computer skills to track the paranormal. Because the writers felt the character's "comical" and "wacky" personality was too unrealistic for the show, he was also removed by the finale.

Other characters returned from the first year. Actor Jim Beaver made multiple appearances as hunter Bobby Singer, an old family friend of the Winchesters. Beaver had expected his first-season guest appearance in "Devil's Trap" to be a "one-shot deal", and was surprised when he was asked to return. Adrianne Palicki reprised her role as Sam's deceased girlfriend Jessica in the alternate-reality episode "What Is and What Should Never Be", as did Samantha Smith as Mary Winchester. Smith also made an appearance in a flashback in the penultimate episode, "All Hell Breaks Loose, Part One". And though at first reluctant because of his role on Grey's Anatomy, Jeffrey Dean Morgan returned as John Winchester in the season premiere and finale. However, the character dies in the premiere because the writers worried that having him separated from his sons again—Sam and Dean spend much of the first season tracking him down—would "split the show" by having him away "doing more interesting things than the boys are doing". As a demon, the villain Azazel periodically switches hosts, and was first fully portrayed by Morgan in the first-season finale. The reins passed to Fredric Lehne for the second-season premiere, and the show's producers enjoyed his performance so much they brought him back for the two-part finale.

Many factors went into the casting decisions of the season's guest stars. Linda Blair, famous for her role in the horror film The Exorcist, appeared in the episode "The Usual Suspects". Though a fan of the show, Blair had turned down a guest appearance in the first season because she did not want to return to horror, having spent years getting a "clean slate". This changed after the television series Extra aired a three-part profile on her acting career and work with animals. It attempted to find a series that would write a role for her as "an actor's piece", rather than a cameo. Kripke, a fan of The Exorcist, offered to write an episode specifically for her, and she was "really touched" when he listened to her request to leave out demons in the storyline. During automated dialogue replacement, Jensen Ackles added in a reference to The Exorcist with the statement, "I could really go for some pea soup."

The casting of Battlestar Galactica Tricia Helfer in "Roadkill" stemmed from the producers' preference to hire actors important to Supernatural fanbase. This was the first episode to have the Winchesters as supporting characters, and Kripke felt "Tricia had the charisma to perform the leading role". Kripke enjoyed Emmanuelle Vaugier's work in television series such as Smallville, and believed she was an "easy choice" for the large role of the soon-to-be werewolf Madison in "Heart". Director Kim Manners felt Vaugier brought to the character a vulnerability like that of Lon Chaney Jr. in The Wolf Man, which made viewers sympathetic. Conspiracy-theorist Ronald of "Nightshifters" was envisioned by writer and consulting producer Ben Edlund as the unsympathetic "semi-drunk Randy Quaid from Independence Day". However, this changed with Chris Gauthier's casting, and Edlund felt that Ronald turned out to be a "really cool" character fans would enjoy. The producers considered Summer Glau for the role of the zombie Angela for "Children Shouldn't Play with Dead Things", but she could not accept due to scheduling conflicts.

Writing

When production of the second season started, Kripke wanted to avoid the monster-of-the-week formula used in the first year. The writers attempted this by including more "human themes," mainly "the things Sam and Dean are truly afraid of: death, grief, betrayal, etc." This change brought the series' focus onto situations such as the brothers dealing with their father's death and giving them the task of hunting down Azazel, the demon who killed him. Morgan feels that the brothers' "inner turmoil" created by the death of his character made them more three-dimensional. While Dean has trouble dealing with his father's death, Kripke wishes they had focused more on Sam's reaction. Instead, the episodes dealt more with Sam's fear of becoming evil, which Kripke regretted since the writers never depicted the character committing malevolent acts. Another main storyline of the season followed Sam and Dean as they track down the various psychic children—young adults like Sam who were visited by Azazel as infants and given abilities. However, the psychic children storyline made the mythology of the second season "dense" and "confusing" for Kripke.

Kripke instead favored the "unique and structurally interesting" self-enclosed episodes, which sometimes arose from the writers' unused ideas. From the series' beginning, Kripke desired to feature an evil clown because he felt that "clowns in a context where they're not supposed to be are friggin' terrifying". To fit with the series, the clown became a shapeshifting Rakshasa of Hindu mythology. This decision made the clown "less satisfying", to Kripke's chagrin, because it limited the clown-related scenes. Another element of folklore favored by Kripke was the story of Robert Johnson, which he focused on in his first screenplay as a writer. He found the legend similar to Supernatural, noting, "It's a piece of real life American history and folklore, it's an American horror story, it takes place on the dusty back roads of rural America, and it's got great music." However, the lore takes place in the early 20th century, and prevented the inclusion of Sam and Dean. To circumvent this, writer Sera Gamble suggested Johnson's story be made into a subplot detailed in flashbacks, with the Crossroads Demon returning in the present to make more deals. Although Gamble envisioned the demon's hellhound as being similar in appearance to a Rottweiler, Kripke felt it would "look stupid". The creature was instead made invisible, which Gamble believes gave it a more terrifying presence.

Before he entered the television industry, writer and consulting producer Ben Edlund had wanted to pen a metafictional script dealing with television production, but decided against it because he did not have production knowledge. He later returned to it for the episode "Hollywood Babylon". Edlund decided to have the production staff look like "goofballs", and made fun of Supernaturals production staff, the network, and the studio. For example, comments made by Gary Cole's "studio suit" character were based on notes from the network and studio for Supernatural during both seasons of production. Other metafictional references include a character commenting on the "terrible script" of Boogeyman, a film written by Kripke; Sam becoming uncomfortable as the studio tour passes the set of Gilmore Girls, a television series in which Padalecki had a recurring role; and Sam proclaiming Hollywood's weather to be "positively Canadian".

Other stories were developed from simple concepts. For example, the reformed-vampire episode "Bloodlust" was developed to suggest that all monsters should not be killed indiscriminately. The plot alluded to "racial issues", but not blatantly; rather, as Padalecki noted, they explored it in a "fun way". The episode "The Usual Suspects" emerged from the writers' desire to keep the audience guessing. Cathryn Humphris pitched a story with a ghost serving as a death omen—warning people of future tragedy, rather than trying to kill them, unlike previous ghosts on the series. However, Humphris had trouble developing the script's outline. Kripke noted a part of the episode in which brothers are arrested and have to explain to police what had happened; this scenario ultimately became the framework of the episode, which begins with Sam and Dean being taken into custody. The concept for "Tall Tales" originated as a "he said, he said" episode, in which the brothers would recount conflicting versions of the same storyline. The writers deliberated over the use of five or six monsters in trying to find one appropriate for the episode, but eventually settled on a trickster because it "can do everything [they] want it to". Although the writers typically prefer to put their own spin on folklore, they decided in this case to remain faithful to the archetypal trickster mythos. Because the season alluded to the possibility of Sam becoming bad, the writers wanted to portray how an evil Sam would behave and what Dean's reaction would be. One of the writers' first creative ideas of the season was depicted in the teaser of "Born Under a Bad Sign", in which a blood-covered Sam wakes up not remembering the past week of his life. The plot, which "fell into place" during the writing process, included demonic possession to explain Sam's actions—an event that resulted in the return of the vengeful Meg Masters demon.

After the plotlines were developed, major deviations sometimes occurred in the writing process. Like in the final version of the script, twins with mind-control abilities were the focus of Edlund's original pitch for the episode "Simon Said". However, the more powerful twin—kept secluded due to deformities—forced his brother to perceive himself as retarded. At the end of the episode, his brother ate him in retaliation. The story was eventually changed, and instead focused on questions such as "What do you do with power?". Kripke felt that this fit greatly with the series' storyline, because Sam was uncomfortable with his developing abilities; the writers wanted to explore one of the psychic children who took his ability as a gift. "Folsom Prison Blues" stemmed from Kripke's desire to feature prison ghosts, and the initial plot had FBI Agent Henriksen finally capturing the brothers and sending them to prison. However, this caused a major complication: the writers would have to devise a way for Sam and Dean to escape in the end. Writer John Shiban suggested that the brothers be arrested on purpose in order to work a job, with the prison's head guard being revealed as a family friend.

The two-part finale "All Hell Breaks Loose" brought many storylines to a close. The psychic children were killed off because the writers felt the characters were not as interesting as demons and monsters. The Roadhouse was destroyed due to Kripke's disliking of the concept; he felt it gave a home to the road show. Fearing that he would disappoint fans by creating too much anticipation, Kripke also decided to answer many questions regarding Azazel's plans in "Part One". The second part ended the brothers' quest to kill Azazel, but also opened more storylines for the third season, such as Dean's demonic pact to resurrect Sam and the question of whether what returned was "one hundred percent pure Sam". Additionally, the "war of demons against humanity"—hinted at throughout the first two seasons—finally started at the finale's end.

Filming
Principal photography took place in Vancouver, British Columbia. The crew used two cameras simultaneously for each scene, which allowed for two different angles to be filmed of the same sequence. The series usually has a dark atmosphere, though production purposefully created a contrasting appearance for certain episodes. "Hollywood Babylon" details the filming of a fake horror movie, and the use of two filming styles helped make a distinction; scenes of the fake film used more saturated colors, while scenes for the actual episode were "down to reality". To depict the perfect world of "What Is and What Should Never Be", the usual shadows and "moody lighting" more made colorful and warm.

Problems during production sometimes arose. For his scenes as the yellow-eyed demon Azazel throughout the season, Fredric Lehne wore hard, colored contact lenses that greatly obscured his vision. The production crew placed sandbags on the floor to help him locate his marks. Lindsey McKeon, who portrayed a Reaper briefly possessed by Azazel in "In My Time of Dying", also experienced the same problem. Her scene—she touches Ackles' forehead—took nine takes to film because she kept missing. Filming for "What Is and What Should Never Be" was interrupted in order to accommodate the busy Adrianne Palicki. Production shifted to the following episode after five days of filming, and resumed when Palicki became available for the final three days.

Because the series uses few standing sets, set designer Jerry Wanek often had to construct entirely new sets for each episode. Outside elements had an influence on some designs, with the bar in the hotel of "Playthings" being an homage to The Shining. A Wisconsin native, Wanek was able to incorporate personal items into the motel set for the Wisconsin-based episode "Nightshifter"; because polka is part of the state's culture, he used posters from his father's old polka band, as well as photos of his nephews and Wisconsin landmarks. Due to "Tall Tales"'s atmosphere, that episode's motel was designed to be "over the top". Wanek noted, "They were in this really odd-looking motel that had crystal chandeliers and carved beds, turquoise stove and refrigerator, and this wonderful period linoleum on the floor. I thought it really matched the tempo and emotion of the show." At times, however, Wanek was able to reuse old sets. The loft set from "No Exit" was redesigned into an apartment for "Crossroad Blues", and the bar in "Born Under a Bad Sign" was a refurbished Roadhouse set.

Not all scenes could take place in the studio, and some were instead shot on location. The vault scenes in "Nightshifter" were filmed in an actual bank safe, as production would not have been able to construct one on set. Outside shots were filmed in downtown Vancouver, forcing streets to be closed off. The crypt of "Houses of the Holy" was built underneath St. Andrew's-Wesley United Church, with plastic used to imitate sculpted stone. Riverview Hospital—used as a filming location in previous episodes—was used for the premiere "In My Time of Dying". It also functioned as a jail in "Folsom Prison Blues" due to, as Wanek describes, "the texture on the walls, the lack of any humanity in the design, and the materials used to build it..." However, the prison block was built on a sound stage. The final scenes of "Simon Said" were filmed at Cleveland Dam, and "All Hell Breaks Loose, Part One" made use of a pre-existing set built for the Western television series Bordertown. The climax of "Part Two" was originally to take place in an actual cemetery, but numerous issues forced production to film the scene in the studio.

Music
The mostly synthesized orchestral score of the season was composed by Christopher Lennertz and Jay Gruska. The pair try to base the music on the visuals of each episode, with about a third of each episode's score being newly written for the supernatural legend. For example, when the werewolf's point of view is depicted in "Heart", Gruska tried to make the score predatorial. For "Roadkill"'s emotional ending, Lennertz used cello and piano to "[tug] at the heart strings" and "push the tears". The music was supposed to "become part of the sinister wallpaper" in "In My Time of Dying". Thus, in the scene involving John Winchester selling his soul to Azazel, Gruska wrote the music as "dark and dank", but feels the viewer would only notice the music if it was removed from the scene.

Other musical elements were based on aspects of the episode, and often used less conventional instruments. For "Simon Said"—featuring characters with the ability of mind-control—Gruska tried to make the score more "mind-trippy", opting to mainly use "synthy, spacey electronica pads" to give it a science-fiction sound. Toy-piano sounds were included in "Playthings" by Gruska to make the score more childlike. Because of the Robert Johnson theme of "Crossroad Blues", Lennertz made sure to be specific to Johnson's style when writing the music for the opening scene. A blues guitarist was brought in, and played on a "beat-up old acoustic guitar". However, they added in dissonant notes to foreshadow the "grittiness to come". Lennertz used organ, drums, bass, and guitar to have a "retro bluesy approach" for "Folsom Prison Blues", mimicking the style of film composer David Holmes. Likewise, he wanted the episode "Nightshifter" to have a "feature film feel", with the score ending up similar to The Bourne Identity. With Linda Blair of The Exorcist guest starring in "The Usual Suspects", Gruska used tubular bells as an homage to the film's score.

In addition to the score, the series makes use of rock songs, with most being selected from Kripke's private collection. Among the many bands featured in the second season are AC/DC, Lynyrd Skynyrd, and Boston. Rock songs are also usually featured in "The Road So Far" montages at the beginning of select episodes that recap previous events. The premiere used Ted Nugent's "Stranglehold", and a "coming soon" sequence midway through the season was set to Nazareth's "Hair of the Dog". The finale recapped the entire season to Kansas' "Carry On Wayward Son". The second season also began the tradition of naming many episodes after classic rock songs, with Kripke preferring Led Zeppelin songs.

Effects
The series makes use of visual, special, and make-up effects, as well as stuntwork. Beginning with the second season, visual effects became an in-house department. Visual effects supervisor Ivan Hayden feels this improved the series because a fixed budget allowed them to compensate for other scenes that lacked effects, such as in "Nightshifter". Wide shots of the bank's exterior—featuring closed-off streets, police, and SWAT helicopters—were accomplished with visual effects. The series' catchphrase—"Scary just got sexy"—was added to a billboard in the background. For the episode "Houses of the Holy", production did not want viewers to be able to determine that the "angel" was in actuality a priest. Thus, the shape engulfed in light was a girl wearing a skintight white leotard. At times, the visual effects used were subtle. Cockroaches were digitally inserted into the sewer scenes of "No Exit"; director Kim Manners did not ask for it, but thought the addition "made it really creepy". The episode "Playthings" featured a scene of a man dying after falling down stairs. The department added blood flowing from underneath him, and also made his fingers twitch and his mouth open and close to create a more lifelike appearance.

The special effects and makeup departments are also important assets to production. Dean has an out-of-body experience in "In My Time of Dying", and some scenes feature him looking at his own body in a hospital bed. To forgo the use of visual effects, the special effects department sculpted a full gelatin face from Ackles, and applied it to a body double. To depict a woman burning to death in the episode "Simon Said", the actress was sealed inside a full body silicone designed to look like her, and was doused with fire accelerant. She was required to breathe through a straw, as well as don underwear soaked in ice-cold fire-retardant gel. Prior to "Heart", Kripke had not wanted to include werewolves in the series, as he felt that the budget would only allow for "a guy with fur glued to his face". As he prefers to have monsters be able to walk among humans, production made the transformation subtle—the character's eyes change, and her canine teeth and fingernails grow. However, writer Sera Gamble believes that they "dropped the ball" in the design, feeling that the creature looked too similar to a vampire.

Reception
Supernatural had low ratings during its second season. Viewers consisted mainly of teenage girls, with the CW trying to attract more males. It ranked No. 216 relative to the position of other prime time network shows. With an average viewership of 3.14 million Americans, the show's future was in doubt at the season's end. Despite this, the series was renewed for a third season. According to Special Forces Soldier Master Sergeant Kevin Wise at a 2007 Supernatural convention, the DVDs most requested by armed forces personnel in Iraq and Afghanistan were the first two seasons of the series.

The second season of the series received positive reviews from critics. The review aggregator website Rotten Tomatoes reported a 100% approval rating with an average rating of 8.15/10 based on 6 reviews. Jim Kaz of IGN gave the season a similar score at 8/10. While at first hesitant of the series, believing it to be "another horror/sci-fi/occult hybrid currently igniting ratings", he found the "eerie and intricate storylines" to overcome the "initial impressions of Clearasil ads and Paris Hilton in House of Wax". Praising the cliffhangers and the brotherly chemistry between the lead actors, Kaz deemed Supernatural "one-helluva edge-of-your-seat, ball-burner of a series with a forceful script, excellent acting (said pretty boys included) and some fine special effects". Maureen Ryan of the Chicago Tribune thoroughly enjoyed the season, and "really, really liked" the Roadhouse. Not understanding why the Roadhouse was not used more throughout the season, she was "pretty annoyed" when it was destroyed. Ryan also favored the new hunter characters, especially Ash, and was "not thrilled" when Ash was killed. Regarding Sam and Dean, she noted the series' "ability  the brotherly conflicts and emotions threaded through a well-plotted monster-of-the-week story". While she enjoyed Tricia Helfer's guest appearance, she did not enjoy the stunt casting of Linda Blair and would have preferred a "more skilled actress". The season received a grade of a B− from Brian Tallerico of UGO, who found it "frustrating" due to the use of the "same predictable formula" that did not meet the standards of the first season. Other problems he found included "the brothers [turning] whiny and mopey and [taking] everything too seriously". However, he believed that the season ended "strong"—he liked how the main storyline was wrapped up, opening new storylines—and noted that there were some "excellent" episodes. Tallerico praised the "tongue-in-cheek Winchester adventure" "The Usual Suspects", feeling that it had "enough pop culture references to make Tarantino jealous" and the "pitch-perfect mix of tones that make the show so great". He also found "Nightshifter" to be the "best action hour of Supernaturals second year", deeming it "riveting from beginning to end". Also applauding the season's cliffhanger was Peter Brown of iFMagazine, who gave the season a B+. He enjoyed the expansion of the series' mythology, as well as the new characters introduced. He also praised the "haunting music and sounds that really give a chilling feel to each and every episode", feeling them to be Emmy-worthy.

The season's cast and crew received the attention of multiple award programs. Writer Raelle Tucker won the Constellation Award for "Best Overall 2007 Science Fiction Film or Television Script" for the episode "What Is and What Should Never Be", and work on "All Hell Breaks Loose, Part Two" garnered a Golden Reel nomination for "Best Sound Editing in Television: Short Form – Sound Effects and Foley". Conchita Campbell gained a Young Artist Award nomination for "Best Performance in a TV Series – Guest Starring Young Actress" for her performance in "Playthings", and Jessica Harmon was nominated in 2008 for a Leo Award in the category of "Best Guest Performance by a Female in a Dramatic Series" for the episode "All Hell Breaks Loose, Part One".

Home media release
The second season of Supernatural was released as a six-disc Region 1 DVD box set in the US on September 11, 2007, two weeks before the premiere of the third season. Including all 22 episodes of the second season, the set also featured DVD extras such as episode commentaries, deleted scenes, bloopers, Jared Padalecki's original screen test, and a featurette on the making of the season finale. The season was ranked No. 13 in DVD sales for its week of release, selling 67,735 sets for $2,573,253. However, it slipped out of the top-30 list the following week. For Region 2, the season was divided into two parts, being released on May 14, 2007, and September 10, 2007; the complete set was released on October 29, 2007. The season was also released in Region 4 on October 3, 2007. The second season was released on Region A Blu-ray Disc on June 14, 2011, including a new special feature–"The Devil's Road Map", an interactive guide featuring interviews about every episode that featured the main cast and directors.

References

Footnotes

Bibliography

External links

 
 
 

Supernatural 02
2006 American television seasons
2007 American television seasons